Fosco Risorti (September 8, 1921 – November 1995) is a retired Italian professional football player. He was born in Fucecchio.

He played for 7 seasons (149 games) in the Serie A for A.S. Roma.

He was blamed for Savoia not achieving promotion in the 1938/39 season after he allowed a goal from a kick taken from the significant distance: the ball bounced unexpectedly off a stone on the field.

During Roma's championship 1941/42 season, he was the backup goalkeeper.

Honours
 Serie A champion: 1941/42.

References

1921 births
1995 deaths
People from Fucecchio
Italian footballers
Serie A players
Serie B players
A.S. Roma players
Association football goalkeepers
Sportspeople from the Metropolitan City of Florence
Footballers from Tuscany